Lincoln Kilpatrick Jr. (born October 4, 1961) is a former child star and American actor during the 1970s.

Biography

Early life
Kilpatrick was born on October 4, 1961 in North Hollywood, California. He was born the eldest of five children born to actor Lincoln Kilpatrick and former performer Helena Ferguson.

Career
Kilpatrick appeared in his first film and began his career at the age of 10 in the movie Dead Men Tell No Tales in 1971 as the role of Mike Carter. Kilpatrick also played the minor role of Jeff in the 1977 TV movie Alexander: The Other Side of Dawn.

Kilpatrick made his first television appearance on the March 9, 1973 episode of the NBC sitcom Sanford and Son. Kilpatrick also made a television appearance on the CBS sitcom Good Times in the episode Michael, the Warlord as Ratbone, the leader of the "Junior Warlords" street gang Michael has been bullied into. The episode aired on October 13, 1976.

Family
Kilpatrick is the son of longtime film and television actor Lincoln Kilpatrick and performer Helena Ferguson. He is also the nephew of actor John Kilpatrick. Kilpatrick is also the brother of actress DaCarla Kilpatrick, actor/director Erik Kilpatrick, actress Jozella Reed, and producer Marjorie L. Reed.

Filmography
Dead Men Tell No Tales (Mike Carter) (1971)

Sanford and Son (Jason) (Episode: "The Kid" air date - March 9, 1973)
Good Times (Ratbone) (Episode: "Michael, the Warlord")
Alexander: The Other Side of Dawn (Jeff) (1977)

References

External links

1961 births
Living people
American male child actors
Male actors from Hollywood, Los Angeles
American male television actors